Miss World is the oldest surviving major international beauty pageant.

Miss World may also refer to:
 "Miss World" (song), a song by Hole
 Miss World (EP), an EP by Flunk